This article displays the squads for the 2016 European Men's Handball Championship. Each team consists of up to 28 players, of whom 16 may be fielded for each match.

Age, club, caps and goals as of 15 January 2016.

Group A

France
A 20-player squad was announced on 26 December 2015. A 17-player squad was announced on 12 January 2016.

Head coach: Claude Onesta

Macedonia
A 23-player squad was announced on 11 December 2015. The final squad was announced on 11 January 2016.

Head coach: Ivica Obrvan

Poland
A 23-player squad was announced on 26 December 2015. It was reduced to 21 on 6 January 2016. The final squad was announced on 14 January 2016.

Head coach: Michael Biegler

Serbia
A 19-player squad was announced on 19 December 2015.

Head coach: Dejan Perić

Group B

Belarus
An 18-player squad was announced on 10 December 2015, which was reduced to 17 on 25 December 2015. 18 players made the journey to Poland.

Head coach: Yuri Shevtsov

Croatia
A 28-player squad was announced on 28 November 2015. It was reduced to 20 on 30 December 2015. On 4 January 2016, Domagoj Pavlović and Mario Vuglač were ruled out due to an injury and Šime Ivić was added to the squad. A 17-player squad was announced on 12 January 2016.

Head coach: Željko Babić

Iceland
A 21-player squad was announced on 21 December 2015. The list was reduced to 18 on 7 January and 17 on 12 January 2016.

Head coach: Aron Kristjánsson

Norway
An 18-player squad was announced on 11 December 2015.

Head coach: Christian Berge

Group C

Germany
The squad was announced on 11 December 2015. Uwe Gensheimer and Patrick Groetzki were ruled out due to injuries on 19 and 25 December 2015. Michael Allendorf would miss the tournament because of an injury, announced on 2 January 2016. Kai Häfner and Julius Kühn were added on 8 and 11 January 2016. The final squad was announced on 14 January 2016.

Head coach: Dagur Sigurðsson

Slovenia
A 21-player squad was announced on 23 December 2015. Klemen Ferlin was replaced by Urban Lesjak on 26 December 2015 due to an injury. The final squad was announced on 12 January 2016.

Head coach: Veselin Vujović

Spain
An 18-player squad was announced on 27 December 2015.

Head coach: Manolo Cadenas

Sweden
The squad was announced on 18 December 2015.

Head coach: Ola Lindgren and Staffan Olsson

Group D

Denmark
An 18-player squad was announced on 17 December 2015. Alexander Lynggaard and Klaus Thomsen were added on 28 December 2015, due to an injury to Rene Toft Hansen. Lasse Andersson was ruled out because of an injury on 30 December 2015.

Head coach: Guðmundur Guðmundsson

Hungary
An 18-player squad was announced on 30 December 2015. A 17-man squad was named on 12 January 2016. The final squad was announced on 13 January 2016.

Head coach: Talant Duyshebaev

Montenegro
A 19-player squad was announced on 30 November 2015.

Head coach: Ljubomir Obradović

Russia
A 21-player squad was announced on 19 December 2015. It was cut to 18 on 13 January 2016.

Head coach: Dmitri Torgovanov

Statistics

Player representation by league system
In all, European  Championship squad members play for clubs in 22 different countries.

Nations in italics are not represented by their national teams in the finals.
German squad have only one player employed by a non-domestic club; that players are employed in Poland. Only Icelandic squad is made up entirely of players employed by overseas clubs; although one player on that squad. Of the countries not represented by a national team at the European Championship, Handball-Bundesliga provides the most squad members.

Player representation by club
Clubs with 10 or more players represented are listed.

Coaches representation by country
Coaches in bold represent their own country.

References

External links
Official website

2016 European Men's Handball Championship
European Handball Championship squads